The Dois Paus redoubt is a redoubt fortification situated on the peninsula of Monte Brasil, in the civil parish of Sé, in the municipality of Angra do Heroísmo, in the Porutguese archipelago of the Azores. It was part of the fortified defenses of the Fortress of São João Baptista.

History

Bartolomeu Ferraz first presented his recommendations to John III of Portugal in 1543 for the fortification of the Azores, then an important waypoint in trans-Atlantic commerce between the Indies and America. On 5 March 1567, in his proposal to the Crown, Engineer Tommaso Benedetto elaborated a plan to protect the island's coastal defence, that included the construction of a fort on Monte Brasil. Shortly following this proposal, the Portuguese Crown began the construction of the Fort of Dois Paus, in order to protect the port of Dois Paus-Portinho Novo. It is unclear from where its name originated; the name "dois paus" is a literally translated as "the redoubt of the two sticks/clubs".

In the context of the Captaincy-General of the Azores, there was a reference to the structure, stating in 1767:
"...In the redoubt of Dois Paus there are three canon emplacements and two pieces...it needs one more with its support."

Its remains continue to lie on the volcanic cone of Monte Brasil to this day, in ruins.

References

Notes

Sources
 
 

Buildings and structures in Angra do Heroísmo
Redoubt Dois Paus